Li Shixin (born 12 February 1988) is a Chinese-born Australian diver who specialises in the 1 metre springboard event. Li won gold medals in the 1 metre springboard event in the 2011 and 2013 World Aquatics Championships.

In 2019, he chose to represent Australia in international competitions.

Li qualified for the Tokyo 2020 Olympics and competed in the Men's 3m Springboard. He came 27th.

At the 2022 World Aquatics Championships, he won a bronze medal in the 1 metre springboard event.

At the 2022 Commonwealth Games, with diving competition held in August, Shixin ranked first in the preliminaries of the 1 metre springboard with a score of 388.70 points and qualified for the final. He won the silver medal in the final with a score of 437.05 points, which was 10.00 points behind gold medalist Jack Laugher of England. With partner Sam Fricker in the 3 metre synchronised springboard the following day, the duo won the bronze medal with a score of 374.52 points. In the morning on day three of diving competition, he scored 456.65 points in the preliminaries of the 3 metre springboard, qualifying for the final ranking first. He placed fifth in the final with a score of 448.50 points, less than 12 points behind fourth-place finisher James Heatly of Scotland. The final day, he won a silver medal in the mixed 3 metre synchronised springboard with partner Maddison Keeney, scoring 304.02 points.

References

1988 births
Living people
Chinese male divers
Australian male divers
People from Maoming
Divers at the 2020 Summer Olympics
Olympic divers of Australia
World Aquatics Championships medalists in diving
Divers at the 2022 Commonwealth Games
Commonwealth Games medallists in diving
Commonwealth Games silver medallists for Australia
Commonwealth Games bronze medallists for Australia
Medallists at the 2022 Commonwealth Games